= Chuchucaruana =

Coordinates: 27.9120°S 65.8434°W

- Municipality and village
- Interactive map of Chuchucaruana
- Country: Argentina
- Province: Catamarca Province
- Time zone: UTC−3 (ART)

Chuchucaruana is a village and municipality in Catamarca Province in northwestern Argentina.
